Sir John Gostwick (c.1480 – 15 April 1545) was an English courtier, administrator and MP.

Life

He was born the son of John Gostwick in Willington, Bedfordshire, and educated in Potton. Around 1510 he entered the service of Cardinal Wolsey and became a Gentleman Usher to Henry VII. He was also a merchant importing caps and hats from the continent of Europe. By 1517 he was a wax chandler. In 1523 he took on an auditorship at court, and pursued a career as a financial officer.

In 1529, Gostwick bought Willington Manor from Thomas Howard, 3rd Duke of Norfolk. He became a member of Gray's Inn and a JP (Justice of the Peace) for Bedfordshire. After Wolsey's death he worked for his successor Thomas Cromwell in a number of important and lucrative roles, acting as a personal paymaster. During the Dissolution of the Monasteries he acquired a considerable number of other properties and in 1538 was one of the judges who sentenced the Abbot of Woburn to be hanged for refusing to sign the Oath of Supremacy. He was knighted in 1540.

In 1539 Gostwick was elected a knight of the shire (MP) for Bedfordshire and in 1540 was appointed High Sheriff of Bedfordshire and Buckinghamshire. He was re-elected to represent Bedfordshire again in December 1544 but died before he could take his seat. At some point in his career as MP he made a direct attack on Thomas Cranmer, as a Lutheran in his views on the sacrament. The incident was dated as in 1544 by John Foxe, but scholars now suspect it was earlier, at the time of the debates on the Six Articles.

Gostwick died in 1545 and was buried in Willington church. He had married Joan and had a son William, who died shortly after his own death. The estates passed to his brother William.

Sources

External links

1545 deaths
People from the Borough of Bedford
High Sheriffs of Bedfordshire
High Sheriffs of Buckinghamshire
English MPs 1539–1540
Year of birth uncertain